Jeong Yeong-a (born 9 December 1990) is a South Korean footballer who plays as a defender for Gyeongju Korea Hydro & Nuclear Power and the South Korea national team.

International career
Jeong played ten matches for the South Korea U20 team between 2008 and 2010 and was a member of the squad that finished third in the 2010 FIFA U-20 Women's World Cup. She made her full international debut on 12 January 2013 in a friendly against Norway.

References

External links

1990 births
Living people
South Korean women's footballers
South Korea women's international footballers
2019 FIFA Women's World Cup players
WK League players
Women's association football defenders